Breakage may refer to:

Breakage (accounting), a term used in telecommunications and accounting to indicate any type of service which is unused by the customer
Breakage (musician), British electronic producer and DJ
"Breakage" (Breaking Bad), an episode from season two of TV series Breaking Bad

See also
 Break (disambiguation)
 Breakages, Limited, a fictional corporation in 1928 play The Apple Cart
 Breakage-fusion-bridge cycle, a mechanism of chromosomal instability
 The Breakage of the Sunflower, Iraqi novels